Takayuki Shimizu (Japanese:清水 隆行, born October 23, 1973, in Tokyo, Japan) is a former professional baseball outfielder for Nippon Professional Baseball. He is currently a Giants coach.

External links

Living people
1973 births
People from Tokyo
Toyo University alumni
Japanese baseball players
Nippon Professional Baseball outfielders
Yomiuri Giants players
Saitama Seibu Lions players
Japanese baseball coaches
Nippon Professional Baseball coaches